The Greenwood is a historic apartment building at 425 Greenwood Street in Evanston, Illinois. Built in 1912, the three-story building is set in a neighborhood of single-family houses. Architect Thomas McCall designed the building in the Prairie School style. The building features an overall horizontal emphasis, casement and bay windows, stained glass, and overhanging eaves. Its six apartments have a railroad plan, in which rooms are organized along a narrow central hallway.

The building was added to the National Register of Historic Places on March 15, 1984.

References

External links

Buildings and structures on the National Register of Historic Places in Cook County, Illinois
Residential buildings on the National Register of Historic Places in Illinois
Buildings and structures in Evanston, Illinois
Residential buildings completed in 1912
Prairie School architecture in Illinois
Apartment buildings in Illinois